1 Chronicles 18 is the eighteenth chapter of the Books of Chronicles in the Hebrew Bible or the First Book of Chronicles in the Old Testament of the Christian Bible. The book is compiled from older sources by an unknown person or group, designated by modern scholars as "the Chronicler", and had the final shape established in late fifth or fourth century BCE. This chapter records the account of David's wars against the neighboring nations and a list of his executive. The whole chapter belongs to the section focusing on the kingship of David (1 Chronicles 9:35 to 29:30).

Text
This chapter was originally written in the Hebrew language. It is divided into 17 verses.

Textual witnesses
Some early manuscripts containing the text of this chapter in Hebrew are of the Masoretic Text tradition, which includes the Aleppo Codex (10th century), and Codex Leningradensis (1008).

There is also a translation into Koine Greek known as the Septuagint, made in the last few centuries BCE. Extant ancient manuscripts of the Septuagint version include Codex Vaticanus (B; B; 4th century), Codex Sinaiticus (S; BHK: S; 4th century), Codex Alexandrinus (A; A; 5th century) and Codex Marchalianus (Q; Q; 6th century).

Old Testament references
: ; .
:.

David conquers the neighboring nations (18:1–13)
The condensation of multiple wars into one narrative provides the impression of David as a warrior, which would disqualified him from the task of building the temple because this requires peace (cf. ). David was successful in his wars against the Philistines to the west (verse 1), against Edom to the southeast (verses 12–13), against Moab (verse 2) and Ammon to the east and against a number of Aramean kings to the northeast (verses 3–8), as a fulfillment of Nathan's prophecy that David would subjugate all his enemies.

Verse 4
And David took from him a thousand chariots, and seven thousand horsemen, and twenty thousand footmen: David also houghed all the chariot horses, but reserved of them an hundred chariots.
"Seven thousand horsemen":  notes "seven hundred horsemen" (KJV; NKJV). The number was probably multiplied by ten by the Chronicler (cf. 1 Chronicles 19:18), or the Chronicler notes the final number of killed horsemen when David 'established his power by the River Euphrates' whereas the number in 2 Samuel 8:4 was when David initially 'recover his border at the River Euphrates'.
"Houghed": or "hamstrung" (NKJV); "crippled"

Verse 12
And Abishai, the son of Zeruiah, killed 18,000 Edomites in the Valley of Salt.
"Abishai, the son of Zeruiah": David's nephew, the eldest son of David's sister, Zeruiah. His name means "father of the gift". He was the commander and "most honoured" of the second rank of David's officers, below the three "mighty men". The parallel text of 2 Samuel 8:13 attributes Abishai's achievement to David. In the title of Psalm 60, Joab, Abishai's brother, got the credit for killing 12,000 Edomites at the same place, suggesting the probability of Abishai commanding the battle, while Joab completed the conquest of the country (cf. 1 Kings 11:16).
"Valley of Salt": located in Edom, also the place of the achievement of Amaziah, who proceeded with ten thousand prisoners to 'precipitate them down the cliff', i.e. Petra.

David’s officials (18:14–17)
This passage contains a list of David's highest officers after the wars, because of the significant role of military ranks during the conquests. It reflects the growth of bureaucracy accompanying the expansion of the kingdom.

Verse 17
Benaiah the son of Jehoiada was over the Cherethites and the Pelethites; and David’s sons were chief ministers at the king’s side.
"Chief ministers at the king’s side": from Hebrew , hā- lə- ha-, literally "the_first_ ones at_the_hand of_the_king." Here it means that 'David employs his sons as high-ranking officials in his cabinet' (not as 'priests' for worship services), a practice that was also performed by at least other two kings (2 Chronicles 11:22–23; 21:3).

See also

Related Bible parts: Exodus 26, Numbers 4, 1 Kings 4, 2 Samuel 8, 1 Chronicles 22, 2 Chronicles 11, 2 Chronicles 21, Psalm 60

References

Sources

External links
 Jewish translations:
 Divrei Hayamim I - I Chronicles - Chapter 18 (Judaica Press) translation [with Rashi's commentary] at Chabad.org
 Christian translations:
 Online Bible at GospelHall.org (ESV, KJV, Darby, American Standard Version, Bible in Basic English)
 First Book of Chronicles Chapter 18. Bible Gateway

18